The 1936 Brooklyn Dodgers season was their seventh in the league. The team failed to improve on their previous season's output of 5–6–1, winning only three games. They failed to qualify for the playoffs for the fifth consecutive season.

NFL Draft

Roster
Roster adapted from Pro-Football-Reference.com.

Schedule

Standings

References

Brooklyn Dodgers (NFL) seasons
Brooklyn Dodgers (NFL)
Brooklyn
1930s in Brooklyn
Flatbush, Brooklyn